Toy is the self-titled debut studio album by English indie rock band Toy, released on 10 September 2012 by Heavenly Recordings.

The album was recorded in early 2012 by Dan Carey at his South London studio. The cover art was designed by artist Leif Podhajsky

Track listing

Personnel
Credits adapted from the liner notes of Toy.

Toy
 Tom Dougall – vocals, guitar
 Dominic O'Dair – guitars
 Alejandra Diez – synths
 Maxim Barron – bass, vocals
 Charlie Salvidge – drums, vocals

Technical
 Dan Carey – production ; mixing 
 Oli Bayston – engineering
 Alexis Smith – engineering
 Ant Theaker – production

Artwork
 Steve Gullick – photography
 Sean Gallagher – artwork, design
 Leif Podhajsky – cover artwork

Chart

References

2012 debut albums
Albums produced by Dan Carey (record producer)
Heavenly Recordings albums
Toy (English band) albums